Colomba is a municipality in Guatemala.

Colomba may also refer to:

 Colomba (surname)
 Colomba Fofana (born 1977), French triple jumper
 Colomba Gabriel (1858–1926), Ukrainian Roman Catholic professed religious and founder of the Benedictine Sisters of Charity
 "Colomba" (novella), a short story by Prosper Mérimée first published in 1840
 Colomba (film), a 1918 German silent film
 Colomba, an opera by Alexander MacKenzie

See also
 Santa Colomba (disambiguation)
 Columba (disambiguation)